Tanya Staneva (born 30 December 1971) is a Bulgarian sports shooter. She competed in the women's 10 metre air pistol event at the 1992 Summer Olympics.

References

External links
 

1971 births
Living people
Bulgarian female sport shooters
Olympic shooters of Bulgaria
Shooters at the 1992 Summer Olympics
People from Targovishte
20th-century Bulgarian women